Sam Raphael (born 24 May 1987) is an Australian cricketer. He made his List A debut for South Australia on 5 October 2015 in the 2015–16 Matador BBQs One-Day Cup.

References

External links
 

1987 births
Living people
Australian cricketers
South Australia cricketers
Cricketers from Adelaide